Native Hawaiian cuisine refers to the traditional Hawaiian foods that predate contact with Europeans and immigration from East and Southeast Asia. The cuisine consisted of a mix of indigenous plants and animals as well as plants and animals introduced by Polynesian voyagers, who became the Native Hawaiians.

History

Voyagers and canoe foods 

The earliest Polynesian seafarers are believed to have arrived on the Hawaiian Islands in 300-500 AD. Few edible plants were indigenous to Hawaiʻi aside from a few ferns and fruits that grew at higher elevations. Fish, shellfish, and limu are abundant in Hawai’i. Flightless birds were easy to catch and eggs from nests were also eaten. Most Pacific islands had no meat animals except bats and lizards. Various food-producing plants were introduced to the island by the migrating Polynesian peoples.

Botanists and archaeologists believe that these voyagers introduced anywhere from 27 to more than 30 plants to the islands, mainly for food. The most important of them was taro. For centuries, taro—and the poi made from it—was the main staple of the Hawaiian diet, and it is still much loved. ʻUala (sweet potatoes) and yams were also planted. The Marquesans, the first settlers from Polynesia, brought ʻulu (breadfruit) and the Tahitians later introduced the baking banana. Settlers from Polynesia also brought coconuts and sugarcane.

Ancient Polynesians sailed the Pacific with pigs, chickens, and Polynesian dogs, and introduced them to the islands. Pigs were raised for religious sacrifice, and the meat was offered at altars, some of which was consumed by priests and the rest eaten in a mass celebration. The early Hawaiian diet was diverse, and may have included as many as 130 different types of seafood and 230 types of sweet potatoes. Some species of land and sea birds were consumed into extinction. The non-native species may have caused various birds, plants and land snails to go extinct.

Early Polynesian settlers brought along with them clothing, plants and livestock and established settlements along the coasts and larger valleys. Upon their arrival, the settlers grew kalo (taro), maiʻa (banana), niu (coconut), and ʻulu (breadfruit). Meats were eaten less often than fruits, vegetables, and seafood. Some did import and raise puaʻa (pork), moa (chicken), and ʻīlio (poi dog).

Ahupua'a 
In ancient Hawai'i, communities divided into sections known as Ahupua'a. These were slices of land that typically stretched from the top of the mountain to the ocean. This division gave each community access to all natural resources the land could provide, and allowed each community to be largely self sufficient. This division importantly gave communities access to streams running through the valleys down to the ocean, which allowed for construction of lo'i, irrigated mud patches that were used for kalo agriculture. In the spaces where the streams met the ocean, estuaries were adapted to fish ponds (aquaculture).

Culinary and cultural traditions
ʻAwa (Piper methysticum, kava) is a traditional food among Hawaiians. Breadfruit, sweet potato, kava, and heʻe (octopus) are associated with the four major Hawaiian gods: Kāne, Kū, Lono and Kanaloa.

Popular condiments included paʻakai (salt), ground kukui nut, limu (seaweed), and ko (sugarcane) which was used as both a sweet and a medicine.

Men did all of the cooking, and food for women was cooked in a separate imu; afterwards men and women ate meals separately per the ancient kapu (taboo) of separating the genders for meals. This kapu was abolished in 1819 at the death of Kamehameha I by his wife Ka'ahumanu. The ancient practice of cooking with the imu continues for special occasions and is popular with tourists.

Thespesia populnea wood was used to make food bowls.

Cyanea angustifolia was eaten in times of food scarcity. It and the now endangered Cyanea platyphylla are known in Hawaiian as hāhā.

There is no fighting when eating from a bowl of poi. It is shared and is connected to the concept because Hāloa (Taro), the first-born son of the parents who begat the human race.

Hawaiians identify strongly with kalo/taro, so much so that the Hawaiian term for family, ʻohana, is derived from the word ʻohā, the shoot or sucker which grows from the kalo corm. As young shoots grow from the corm, so people too grow from their family.

Ingredients

Staple ingredients 

 Kalo (Taro) was the primary staple food in the Native Hawaiian diet. The tubers are grown in lo`i kalo, terraced mud patches often utilizing spring-fed or stream irrigation. Kalo are typically steamed and eaten in chunks or pounded into pa`iai or poi. Additionally, the leaves are also utilized as wrappings for other foods for steaming.
 `Uala (Sweet potato) was another common staple crop that was introduced by the first Polynesians to voyage to Hawai`i. The potato required much less water to cultivate than kalo, so it was important in regions that lacked sufficient precipitation for construction of lo`i kalo. `Uala can be prepared in similar ways to kalo, including steaming, boiling, or cooked in an imu with other foods.
 `Ulu (Breadfruit) was the last of the three staple crops that were introduced to Hawai`i by the Polynesians. `Ulu fruits grow on trees, unlike the previous two staple crops, kalo and `uala, which are grown in the ground. These varied agricultural needs allowed the Native Hawaiians to have a good level of resistance and resilience to seasonal changes in precipitation. `Ulu is a starchy fruit and can be prepared in similar ways to `Uala and Kalo.
 I`a (fish) and other seafood such as Opihi (limpets) and Wana (sea urchin) were a large part of the Native Hawaiian diet, as the reef ecosystems surrounding the Hawaiian islands made for an abundant food source. Seafood was largely eaten raw and seasoned with sea salt and limu (seaweed). This preparation gave birth to the now popular dish poke. The most common fishes eaten by Native Hawaiians were aku (skipjack), ahi (yellowfin tuna), and mahi mahi (common dolphinfish).
 Hāpuʻu ʻiʻi, (Hawaiian tree fern) (Cibotium menziesii) is an example of a food endemic to the Hawaiian Islands that was not introduced by the Polynesian voyagers. The uncoiled fronds (fiddles) are eaten boiled. The starchy core of the ferns was considered a famine food or used as pig feed. It was prepared by peeling the young fronds or placing the entire trunk with the starchy center in an ʻimu or volcanic steam vents. A saying was "He hāpuʻu ka ʻai he ai make" (If the hāpuʻu is the food, it is the food of death).

Royal and celebratory ingredients 
Certain foods were eaten primarily by the royalty and nobility. These were also sometimes consumed by common people. These include Pua`a (pig), Moa (chicken) and `Ilio (dog). All of these animals were introduced to Hawai`i, which prior to Polynesian voyagers did not have any large mammals. Pigs were hunted, while chickens and dogs were raised domestically. Animals were slow cooked primarily in imu, or underground ovens made by burying food with hot rocks and banana wood. They were also often cooked by cutting the animal open, filling its body with hot rocks, and wrapping it in ti, banana, and kalo leaves.

Dishes and preparations 
Most cooked foods eaten by Native Hawaiians, were prepared either through steaming, boiling, or slow cooking in underground ovens known as imu. Due to their lack of non-flammable cooking vessels, steaming and boiling were achieved by heating rocks in fires and placing the hot rocks in bowls of water. Many other foods, such as fruits and most seafood, were eaten raw.

 Kalua, pig cooked underground in an imu.
 Poi (pronounced po-ee) is made from cooked, mashed, and sometimes lightly fermented taro. It is the starch staple of the native Hawaiian diet.
 Laulau is made with beef, pork, or chicken and salted butterfish wrapped in taro leaves and then ti leaves. It was traditionally prepared in an imu.
 Poke (pronounced po-keh) is a raw marinated fish or other seafood salad (such as ahi poke or octopus poke). It is made with sea salt, seaweed, kukui nut oil and in more recent times with soy sauce and sesame oil.
 Lūʻau (pronounced Loo-ow) is made with coconut milk cooked with taro leaves in a pot. It has a creamy consistency. Squid is usually cooked with this dish, but chicken is sometimes substituted for the squid.
 Haupia (pronounced how-pee-ah) is a flan like dessert made with coconut milk and ground arrowroot. Cornstarch has become a widespread substitute for the arrowroot.
 Ko'ele palau (pronounced ko-ele pa-lao) is a dessert made from cooked sweet potato mashed and mixed with coconut milk.
 Inamona is a traditional relish or condiment often accompanied meals and is made of roasted and mashed kukui nutmeats, and sea salt. It sometimes mixed with edible seaweed.
 Kulolo (pronounced ku-lo-lo) is a pudding dessert made from grated taro corm and coconut milk that's baked in an imu, having a fudge-like consistency.
 Piele is another Hawaiian pudding similar to Kulolo, with grated sweet potato or breadfruit mixed with coconut cream and baked.

Festivals and special occasions
On important occasions, a traditional ʻahaʻaina feast was held. When a woman was to have her first child, her husband started raising a pig for the ʻahaʻaina mawaewae feast that was celebrated for the birth of a child. Besides the pig, mullet, shrimp, crab, seaweed, and taro leaves were required for the feast.

The modern name for such feasts, lūʻau, was not used until 1856, replacing the Hawaiian words ʻahaʻaina and pāʻina. The name lūʻau came from the name of a food always served at a ʻahaʻaina, young taro tops baked with coconut milk and chicken or octopus.

Pigs and dogs were killed by strangulation or by holding their nostrils shut in order to conserve the animal's blood. Meat was prepared by flattening out the whole eviscerated animal and broiling it over hot coals, or it was spitted on sticks. Large pieces of meat, such as fowl, pigs and dogs, would be typically cooked in earth ovens, or spitted over a fire during ceremonial feasts.

Hawaiian earth ovens, known as an imu, combine roasting and steaming in a method called kālua. A pit is dug into earth and lined with volcanic rocks and other rocks that do not split when heated to a high temperature, such as granite.  A fire is built with embers, and when the rocks are glowing hot, the embers are removed and the foods wrapped in ti, ginger or banana leaves are put into the pit, covered with wet leaves, mats and a layer of earth. Water may be added through a bamboo tube to create steam.

The intense heat from the hot rocks cooked food thoroughly—the quantity of food for several days could be cooked at once, taken out and eaten as needed, and the cover replaced to keep the remainder warm.  Sweet potatoes, taro, breadfruit and other vegetables were cooked in the imu, as well as fish. Saltwater eel was salted and dried before being put into the imu. Chickens, pigs and dogs were put into the imu with hot rocks inserted in the abdominal cavities.

Paʻina is the Hawaiian word for a meal and can also be used to refer to a party or feast. One tradition that includes paʻina is the four-month-long Makahiki ancient Hawaiian New Year festival in honor of the god Lono (referred to as the sweet potato god) of the Hawaiian religion. Makahiki includes a first phase of spiritual cleansing and making hookupu offerings to the gods.

The Konohiki, a class of royalty that at this time of year provided the service of tax collector, collected agricultural and aquacultural products such as pigs, taro, sweet potatoes, dry fish, kapa and mats. Some offerings were in the form of forest products such as feathers.

The Hawaiian people had no money or other similar medium of exchange. The goods were offered on the altars of Lono at heiau—temples—in each district around the island. Offerings also were made at the ahu, stone altars set up at the boundary lines of each community. All war was outlawed to allow unimpeded passage of the image of Lono.

The festival proceeded in a clockwise circle around the island as the image of Lono (Akua Loa, a long pole with a strip of tapa and other embellishments attached) was carried by the priests. At each ahupuaa (each community also is called an ahupuaa) the caretakers of that community presented hookupu to the Lono image, a fertility god who caused things to grow and who gave plenty and prosperity to the islands.

The second phase of celebration includes: hula dancing, sports (boxing, wrestling, Hawaiian lava sledding, javelin marksmanship, bowling, surfing, canoe races, relays, and swimming), singing, and feasting. In the third phase, the waa auhau (tax canoe)was loaded with hookupu and taken out to sea where it was set adrift as a gift to Lono.

At the end of the Makahiki festival, the chief would go off shore in a canoe. When he came back in he stepped on shore and a group of warriors threw spears at him. He had to deflect or parry the spears to prove his worthiness to continue to rule.

Legacy of traditional Hawaiian cuisine
Native Hawaiian dishes have evolved and been integrated into contemporary fusion cuisine. Apart from lūau for tourists, native Hawaiian cuisine is less common than other ethnic cuisine in parts of Hawaii, but restaurants such as Helena's Hawaiian Food and Ono Hawaiian Foods specialize in traditional Hawaiian food.

See also

 Cuisine of Hawaii
 List of Hawaiian dishes
 List of regional dishes of the United States

References

Bibliography

 .
 .
 .
 .
 .
 .
 .
 .
 .
 .
 .
 .
 .
 .
 .
 .
 .
 .
 .
 .
 .
 .
 .
 .
 .
 .
 .
 .
 .
 .
 .
 .
 .

Hawaiian cuisine
Polynesian cuisine